Pettit is an English surname of Hiberno-Norman origin. Variant spellings include Pettitt and Petitt. People with the surname include:

In arts and media
B. R. Pettit (1947–2006), American sculptor
Catriona Pettit (born 1971), Australian television presenter
George Pettit (born 1982), Canadian vocalist
Alex Pettit (born 1986), American computer scientist, professor, and vocalist
Lloyd Pettit (1927–2003), American sportscaster
Thomas S. Pettit (1843–1931), newspaper publisher and politician from Kentucky
Tom Pettit (1931–1995), American television news correspondent

In government, law, and politics

Canada
George Hamilton Pettit (1872–1953), Canadian politician
Nathaniel Pettit (1724–1803), Upper Canada politician
Trevor Pettit (born 1951), Canadian politician

United States
Albert Pettit (1930–1997), U.S. Representative from Pennsylvania
Alex Pettit (born 1966), American public administration official
Charles Pettit (1736–1806), American lawyer and merchant
H. Foster Pettit (1930–2014), American politician
John Pettit (1807–1877), United States Representative and Senator from Indiana
John U. Pettit (1820–1881), U.S. Representative from Indiana 
Milton Pettit (1835–1873), Wisconsin politician
Thomas M. Pettit (1797–1853), politician and judge from Pennsylvania
Thomas S. Pettit (1843–1931), newspaper publisher and politician from Kentucky
William B. Pettit (1825–1905), American lawyer from Virginia

Other countries
Philip Pettit (born 1945), Irish philosopher and political theorist
Thomas Pettit (mayor) (1858–1934), mayor of Nelson, New Zealand

In science and academia
Becky Pettit (born 1970), American sociologist
Donald Pettit (born 1955), American astronaut
Alex Pettit (born 1986), American computer scientist, professor, and vocalist
Edison Pettit (1889–1962), American astronomer
Joseph M. Pettit (1916–1986), American academic
Katherine Pettit (1868–1936), American educator
Philip Pettit (born 1945), Irish philosopher and political theorist
Rowland Pettit (1927—1981), American chemist
Steve Pettit, (born 1955), President of Bob Jones University

In sport

Baseball
Bob Pettit (baseball) (1861–1910), American baseball player
Chris Pettit (born 1984), American baseball player
Leon Pettit (1902–1974), American baseball pitcher
Paul Pettit (1931-2020), American baseball pitcher

Other sports
Bob Pettit (born 1932), American basketball player
Daniel Pettit (1915–2010), English footballer and industrialist
Nicola Pettit (born 1978), New Zealand netball player 
Sean Pettit (born 1992), Canadian freeskier
Terry Pettit, American volleyball coach
Tom Pettit (footballer) (1885–1970), Australian rules footballer

In other fields
Charles Pettit (1736–1806), American lawyer and merchant
Daniel Pettit (1915–2010), English footballer and industrialist
Gabrielle Petit (feminist) (1860–1952), French feminist activist, anticlerical, libertarian socialist, newspaper editor
Jane Bradley Pettit, American philanthropist
Lyman C. Pettit (1868–1950), American pastor
Robert Lee Pettit (1906–1941), American naval enlisted man; recipient of the Navy Cross
William H. Pettit (1885–1985), New Zealand Christian missionary

See also
Pettit (disambiguation)
Pettitt (surname)
Petit (disambiguation)
Andy Pettitte (born 1972), American baseball pitcher

English-language surnames